Syllepte aechmisalis is a moth in the family Crambidae. It was described by Francis Walker in 1859. It is found in Mexico (Vera Cruz, Guerrero, Yucatán) and Guatemala.

References 

Moths described in 1859
Moths of Central America
aechmisalis
Taxa named by Francis Walker (entomologist)